Marvic Valentin Castelo Sotto (born April 28, 1954), professionally known as Vic Sotto, is a Filipino actor, singer and comedian known far and wide for his various television and film projects on the major Philippine television networks GMA, TV5, and ABS-CBN. He is one of three pioneer hosts of Eat Bulaga!, which is the longest-running Philippine noontime variety show. Sotto is also a veteran actor and host in the entertainment industry.

He owns the film and TV production company M-Zet Productions. Sotto won four consecutive titles as Philippine Box Office King from 2004 to 2006 awarded by the Guillermo Mendoza Memorial Scholarship Foundation Awards, and received three nominations for Best Actor at the Metro Manila Film Festival.

Early life 
Vic Sotto was born as Marvic Valentin Castelo Sotto on April 28, 1954 at Manila, Philippines. He is the youngest son of Marcelino Antonio Ojeda Sotto Sr. (1917-1999) and Dr. Herminia Castelo. He has three brothers Val Sotto (b. 1945), Tito Sotto (b. 1948), and Marcelino Antonio Sotto, Jr. (b. 1952).

Vic comes from a notable political family in the Philippines. His paternal grandfather was Vicente Sotto y Yap, who infamously authored the Press Freedom Law of 1946 during his term in the Senate. His granduncle, Filemon Sotto y Yap, also served as a member of the House of Representatives for four consecutive terms and a senator in the early 1900s. Tito Sotto his brother, served as a senator in from the 1990s to the 2010s.

Education 
He studied at Colegio de San Juan de Letran.

Career

Early career
He started his career as a folk singer and guitarist. During these years, Sotto was also the lead vocalist of the disco funk band VST & Company. He produced such songs as "Awitin Mo at Isasayaw Ko", "Rock Baby Rock", and "Kung Sakali".

He joined his brothers Tito and Val in the early 1970s gag show OK Lang under IBC 13. This is where he met another comedian, Joey de Leon, who invited the brothers to join him. The trio of Tito, Vic and Joey (TVJ) was thus formed, casting in Iskul Bukol, TVJ (Television's Jesters), Rock and Roll 2000 and hosting Eat Bulaga!.

Tito, Vic and Joey
In 1976, the Sotto brothers Tito, Vic and Val were invited by former OK Lang co-star Joey de Leon to co-host an episode of GMA Network's late afternoon variety show Discorama hosted by Bobby Ledesma. Only Tito and Vic accepted de Leon's invitation. The newly formed trio began to do comedy newscast segments interspersed with Top 40 hit-song parodies. Originally, the trio's appearance was supposed to be a one-off invitation as Discorama was set to be axed but after getting good feedback from the viewers and ratings were high, the show was given a new lease on life by GMA management. The trio was later invited to become part of the noontime show Student Canteen as they released 12 albums based on their Discorama Tough Hits segment.

The sitcom Iskul Bukol that gave them nationwide fame as comedians. Soon after, other TV and movie offers came knocking on the trio's door.

In 1979, Tito, Vic and Joey began hosting the noontime show Eat Bulaga!, which was pitted against the more established Student Canteen. Not long after, Eat Bulaga! toppled Student Canteen from the ratings. The trio is still active on both Holy Week Dramas every Lenten Season and also on comedy variety show on Eat Bulaga!.

Later career
In the last three decades, he has done sitcoms and television shows for three networks, ABS-CBN, GMA Network and TV5 (most of which were for GMA).

Personal life
Vic Sotto married actress Dina Bonnevie in 1982 and had two children, Danica and Oyo. The married couple broke up in 1986 after Vic and their marriage was annulled in 1992. Actress Coney Reyes joined Eat Bulaga! in 1982 as Chiqui Hollman's replacement. During her hosting stint, Coney and Vic married together and had a son named Vico Sotto. Angela Luz was a one-time leading lady for Vic in the television series Okay Ka, Fairy Ko when they got together sometime after he broke up with Coney Reyes. Angela Luz gave birth to Vic Sotto's fourth child, Paulina.

Vic also had relationships with his fellow Eat Bulaga! co-hosts Christine Jacob in the early 1990s and Pia Guanio in the late 2000s, but both ended in a breakup. While Christine Jacob quit hosting Eat Bulaga! after ending the relationship, Pia Guanio decided to stay in the show.

Eventually, Vic married young actress Pauleen Luna, who is also an Eat Bulaga! co-host. They were married on 2016 and have one child Tallitha Maria, who is the youngest of Sotto's five children.

Sotto also has nine grandchildren (three from Danica, five from Oyo, and one from Paulina).

Controversies

Pepsi Paloma gang rape case 

In 1982, the 15-year old actress Pepsi Paloma accused Sotto and fellow comedians Joey de Leon and Richie D'Horsie of gang raping and taking photos of her on June 21 in a room at the Sulo Hotel in Quezon City. On July 31, Paloma's manager Rey Dela Cruz lodged a formal complaint with Defense Minister Juan Ponce Enrile. On August 18, Paloma filed charges of rape and acts of lasciviousness against the three television personalities before the Quezon City fiscal's office. The crime of rape at the time, carried the death penalty in the Philippines, and to prevent his brother from being sent to the electric chair, Tito Sotto quickly went to see Paloma while she was still securing the services of Atty. Rene Cayetano. According to Paloma, Tito Sotto pressured her into signing an "Affidavit of Desistance" to drop the rape charges against his brother and cohorts—Tito Sotto had allegedly placed a pistol on the table in front of Paloma when he went to talk to her.

In exchange for the dismissal of the charges of rape, Vic Sotto, de Leon and D'Horsie issued a public apology to Paloma:

Despite the suspects' earlier apology, Tito Sotto has maintained his position against any involvement in the whitewashing of the rape case and alleges that the scandal was a gimmick by Paloma's party for publicity. Again, in spite of a live apology issued to the people, Sotto said that he was not involved as a perpetrator in the rape of Paloma and he denied using his position in government to influence the court decision. Sotto became Vice Mayor in Quezon City in 1988 before being elected as a Senator in 1992. In 2018, Sotto requested The Philippine Inquirer to remove published articles available online mentioning the Pepsi Paloma Case, claiming them to be "fake news" (though clearly was not the case), and damaging to his current reputation as a Senator.

In May 1985, Paloma was found dead in an apparent suicide, though evidence suggests this was actually murder in order to prevent her from testifying against Sotto in court. Dela Cruz was murdered years later.

Filmography

Film

Television

Awards and nominations

References

External links

1954 births
Living people
ABS-CBN personalities
Colegio de San Juan de Letran alumni
De La Salle University alumni
Tagalog people
Filipino television variety show hosts
Filipino game show hosts
Filipino male film actors
Filipino male television actors
20th-century Filipino male singers
Filipino male comedians
GMA Network personalities
Intercontinental Broadcasting Corporation personalities
Manila sound musicians
Radio Philippines Network personalities
Vic
20th-century Filipino male actors
21st-century Filipino male actors